Tyler Smith (born August 9, 1986), also known by his nickname Telle, is an American musician and songwriter. He is currently the lead vocalist of Arizona metalcore band The Word Alive and has played in several bands, such as  Greeley Estates and In Fear and Faith. He is known for his tenor singing voice, wide vocal range and ability to comprehensively alternate between melodic and screamed vocals.

Musical career

Smith joined In Fear and Faith as one of their two lead vocalists in May 2007 to replace founding vocalist Jarred DeArmas. Smith performed on the band's debut release Voyage and was a member of the band until January 2008 (a month after the release of the EP), when he joined Phoenix, Arizona-based Greeley Estates as bassist.

Smith was a member of Greeley Estates from January 2008 to November 2008. He left the band on November 14, 2008, the day before the band was about to go on tour with Alesana. The band said "not to fret" and that the position would be filled.
During this brief association, Smith was featured on some tracks from the album Go West Young Man, Let the Evil Go East.

Upon his departure, he joined the Word Alive, originally a side-project by former Blessthefall and Escape the Fate's Craig Mabbitt, on December 3, 2008.
Smith replaced Mabbitt, due to Mabbitt's unavailability to tour with the band. Smith is featured on the band's second EP, Empire. A year in advance of its release, Smith confirmed the writing of the Word Alive's first studio album. On January 20, 2010, he stated it would be titled Deceiver. Deceiver was released on August 31, 2010.

In 2010, the Word Alive were included in Underoath's November tour. At the Mission, Texas show, Smith substituted for Underoath vocalist Spencer Chamberlain who had contracted food poisoning during the tour's final week. On January 24, 2011, while the Word Alive were on tour with Texas in July and For Today, Smith was hospitalized due to an unknown virus and bacterial bronchitis, laryngitis and pharyngitis along with a fever of 103.6 °F. He missed 9 tour dates. In 2011, Smith wrote and completed two new songs, "Apologician" and "Lights and Stones", for the deluxe edition of Deceiver, which was released on June 7, 2011.

On March 31, 2012, the Word Alive released a new song by the name of "Wishmaster". On that same day, they confirmed the new album Life Cycles would be released on July 3. The album currently has two singles called "Entirety" and the eponymous "Life Cycles".

Personal life

Tyler Smith was born in Dayton, Ohio. He is an adherent of the Christian faith.

By early 2011, Smith began a clothing line by the name of Resist & Rebel, which he co-operated with Andrew Paiano (Woe, Is Me) until 2013 when Andrew stepped down.

Discography
In Fear and Faith
Voyage (2007)

Greeley Estates
Go West Young Man, Let the Evil Go East (2008)

The Word Alive
Empire (2009)
Deceiver (2010)
Life Cycles (2012)
Real (2014)
Dark Matter (2016)
Violent Noise (2018)
Monomania (2020)

Solo
"A Mountain" (2011)
"Touch of Your Lips" (2012)
"Crazy" (2020)
"Too Hard on Myself" (2020)
"Letting Go" featuring Mindy White (2021)

Collaborations

References

External links
 
 

1986 births
American heavy metal singers
American tenors
Musicians from Dayton, Ohio
Singers from Ohio
Singers from California
Singers from Arizona
American heavy metal guitarists
American heavy metal bass guitarists
American male bass guitarists
American people of Dutch descent
Living people
People from Oceanside, California
Guitarists from Arizona
Guitarists from California
Guitarists from Ohio
Underoath members
21st-century American singers
21st-century American bass guitarists
21st-century American male singers